The Mines and Collieries Act 1842 (5 & 6 Vict c. 99), commonly known as the Mines Act 1842, was an act of the Parliament of the United Kingdom. The Act forbade women and girls of any age to work underground and introduced a minimum age of ten for boys employed in underground work. It was a response to the working conditions of children revealed in the Children's Employment Commission (Mines) 1842 report. The Commission was headed by Anthony Ashley-Cooper, Member of Parliament, who was styled Baron Ashley at the time, a courtesy title, and would succeed his father as the 7th Earl of Shaftesbury in 1852.

At the beginning of the 19th century methods of coal extraction were primitive and the workforce, men, women and children, laboured in dangerous conditions. In 1841 about 216,000 people were employed in the mines. Women and children worked underground for 11 or 12 hours a day for smaller wages than men. The public became aware of conditions in the country's collieries in 1838 after an accident at Huskar Colliery in Silkstone, near Barnsley. A stream overflowed into the ventilation drift after violent thunderstorms causing the death of 26 children; 11 girls aged from 8 to 16 and 15 boys between 9 and 12 years of age. The disaster came to the attention of Queen Victoria who ordered an inquiry.

In 1840 Lord Ashley headed the royal commission of inquiry, which investigated the conditions of workers (especially children) in the coal mines. Commissioners visited collieries and mining communities gathering information sometimes against the mine owners' wishes. The report, illustrated by engraved illustrations and the personal accounts of mineworkers was published in May 1842. Victorian society was shocked to discover that children as young as five or six worked as trappers, opening and shutting ventilation doors down the mine, before becoming hurriers, pushing and pulling coal tubs and corfs. Lord Ashley deliberately appealed to Victorian prudery, focussing on girls and women wearing trousers and working bare-breasted in the presence of boys and men, which "made girls unsuitable for marriage and unfit to be mothers". Such an affront to Victorian morality ensured the bill was passed.

Lord Londonderry, a coal-mine owner, opposed the bill in the House of Lords and pushed through amendments that watered it down. The bill passed the House of Lords at its third reading on 1 August 1842.

Results of the act 
No females could be employed underground.
No child under 10 years old was to be employed underground.
Parish apprentices between the ages of 10 and 18 could continue to work in the mines

Citations

Sources 

1842 in labor relations
Coal mining in the United Kingdom
Coal mining law
Health and safety in the United Kingdom
History of mining in the United Kingdom
Occupational safety and health law
United Kingdom Acts of Parliament 1842
United Kingdom labour law
Women in mining